The 1934 Fresno State Bulldogs football team represented Fresno State Normal School—now known as California State University, Fresno—during the 1934 college football season.

Fresno State competed in the Far Western Conference (FWC). The 1934 team was led by second-year head coach Leo Harris and played home games at Fresno State College Stadium] on the campus of Fresno City College in Fresno, California. They finished the season as co-champion of the FWC, with a record of seven wins, two losses and one tie (7–2–1, 3–0–1 FWC). The Bulldogs outscored their opponents 225–77 for the season, including holding their opponents under 10 points in six of the ten games.

Schedule

Notes

References

Fresno State
Fresno State Bulldogs football seasons
Northern California Athletic Conference football champion seasons
Fresno State Bulldogs football